Nagara is a historic village in the Shivamogga district of the state of Karnataka, India. This was called  Bidanur (Bidanoor) or Bidnur (Bidanoor) earlier during the 16th century, this was the last capital city of Keladi rulers.

In 1763, Hyder Ali, Sarvadhikari of Mysore captured this fort and called Hydernagar or Hydernagara after his name "Hyder". Farmers of the region in and around the village were instrumental in sparking the Nagar revolt against the Mysore kingdom in 1830.

Nagara was resided by an independence activist by the name of Sripathy Rao Baliga (1914–2003) who continued to work for the welfare of the village in the post independence era.

Shivappa Nayaka palace, fort, Devaganga tank, Neelakenteshwara temple and Gudde Venkataramana Swamy temple are worth visiting. The fort is built on a small hill, beside a lake. The fort has a system to circulate water around it for safety.

On the hill, within the fort, there are Darbar Hall (King's Court), remains of a palace, two tanks called Akka Thangi Kola (Tanks of two sisters), and a cannon. Devaganga tank is a cluster of seven tanks for bathing. Nagara in Kannada language literally means city. The place is amidst green thick forests which are giving way to urbanisation and eventually to deforestation.

The nearest airport is Mangalore International Airport, situated 146Km from Nagara.

See also
 Ikkeri
 Keladi
 Kodachadri

References

Villages in Shimoga district
Nayakas of Keladi